The 2017 World Taekwondo Grand Prix was the 5th edition of the World Taekwondo Grand Prix series.

Schedule

Men

58 kg

68 kg

80 kg

+80 kg

Women

49 kg

57 kg

67 kg

+67 kg

Medal table

References

External links
Official website

World Taekwondo Grand Prix
Grand Prix
August 2017 sports events in Russia